Creech is an unincorporated community in Benton County, Arkansas, United States.

A post office was established at Creech in 1880, and remained in operation until being discontinued in 1905.

References

Unincorporated communities in Benton County, Arkansas
Unincorporated communities in Arkansas
1880 establishments in Arkansas